"New Friend Request" is a song by American rap rock band Gym Class Heroes, released as the second single from their third studio album, As Cruel as School Children (2006). The single was released on 23 October in the UK and was the band's second consecutive single to be a non-chart qualifier as both physical formats contained a sticker, which is against UK chart rules regarding promotional pack-ins.

A remix, produced by Hi-Tek, is featured on the soundtrack album Snakes on a Plane: The Album.

Music video
The music video for "New Friend Request" is a MySpace-themed video. It has people that are depicted as "friends" on MySpace, and Travis McCoy has to add friends on his MySpace page. He has trouble finding friends, because most of them have flaws and he is trying to find the perfect ones. At the end, Travis ends up finding friends and something better—a girlfriend.

Formats and track listings
CD
 "New Friend Request"
 "Make Out Club" (live in Pittsburgh)

CD (Remix)
 "New Friend Request" (radio version remix) featuring Papoose
 "New Friend Request" (instrumental)

7" vinyl
 "New Friend Request"
 "Artwork Etching"

References

2006 songs
Gym Class Heroes songs
Songs written by Rick Davies
Songs written by Roger Hodgson
Song recordings produced by S*A*M and Sluggo